Chai River Reservoir is a Large Type II reservoir located in Tieling County. Currently it serves as a drinking water source of Yinzhou District, Tieling and other adjacent areas.

References

Reservoirs in China
Buildings and structures in Tieling